The J105 (Naite) is a Sony Ericsson mobile phone from its J series of phones, which was released in May 2009. It is a relatively cheap candybar phone that is placed at the bottom of Sony Ericsson's "Greenheart" range. The 2 MP fixed-focus camera is capable of capturing a still picture at a resolution of 1600x1200 pixels, and recording with a 320x240-pixel resolution at a 15 fps frame rate.

Features
The phone was the cheapest handset with 3G capabilities and secondary video-calling camera at the time of its launch.

Java Platform 8
It has Sony Ericsson Java Platform 8 profile and so allows Flash Lite to run as a front-end to Java ME.

References

External links
 SonyEricsson.com

Sony Ericsson mobile phones
Mobile phones introduced in 2009